The Aire is a river of northern France, crossing the departments of Meuse and Ardennes. It is a right tributary of the Aisne. Its source is near Saint-Aubin-sur-Aire in Meuse. It flows through the towns of Pierrefitte-sur-Aire, Clermont-en-Argonne, Varennes-en-Argonne and Grandpré, finally flowing into the Aisne in Termes.

References

Rivers of France
Rivers of Grand Est
Rivers of Meuse (department)
Rivers of Ardennes (department)